Cornifrons is a genus of moths of the family Crambidae.

Species
Cornifrons actualis Barnes & McDunnough, 1918
Cornifrons albidiscalis Hampson in Poulton, 1916
Cornifrons phasma Dyar, 1917
Cornifrons ulceratalis Lederer, 1858

References

Evergestinae